2013 UEFA European Under-21 Championship, or simply the 2013 Euro Under-21, was the 19th staging of UEFA's European Under-21 Championship. The final tournament was hosted by Israel from 5–18 June 2013.

The Israeli bid was chosen by UEFA's Executive Committee on 27 January 2011 in Nyon, Switzerland. This bid defeated the other bids from Bulgaria, Czech Republic, England and Wales.

Spain defended the title they won two years prior, winning their fourth championship after defeating Italy 4–2 in the final.

Qualification

The draw for the group stage of qualifying for the 2013 UEFA European Under-21 Championship took place on 3 February in Nyon, Switzerland. 52 national teams took part in the qualifying. The group stage of qualifying began on 25 March 2011.
There were a total of ten groups, consisting of five or six teams each. All the teams in each group faced each other two times, at home and away. The team at the top of each group and the four best second-placed teams qualified to the playoff round. In the playoff round, the 14 teams were drawn to play seven two-legged matches. The winners joined Israel in the tournament finals.

List of qualified teams
The following teams qualified for the 2013 UEFA European Under-21 Championship:

 (hosts)

Venues
The Competition was played at four venues in major cities all around Israel: Bloomfield (Tel Aviv), Teddy (Jerusalem), HaMoshava (Petah Tikva) and the Netanya Stadium (Netanya).

Match officials

In December 2012, it was announced that these six referees would take charge of matches at the final tournament:

Ivan Bebek (Croatia)
Serhiy Boiko (Ukraine)
Antony Gautier (France)
Paweł Gil (Poland)
Ovidiu Haţegan (Romania)
Matej Jug (Slovenia)

It was furthermore announced that additional assistant referees would be deployed at Israel's final tournament.

Seeding
The draw for the final tournament took place on 28 November 2012 in Tel Aviv. As the highest-ranked team according to the competition coefficient rankings, Spain were one of the top two seeds alongside hosts Israel. Those two sides were drawn into separate groups, as were the second and third-ranked teams in the list, England and the Netherlands. The remaining four countries were unseeded and were placed in the remaining positions in the two four-team sections.

Squads

The deadline for the submission of the final 23-man squads was 26 May 2013, ten days before the opening match.

Group stage
The draw for the group stage was held on 28 November 2012 in Tel Aviv.

All times are local (UTC+3).

Group A

Group B

Knockout stage

Bracket

Semifinals

Final

Team of the Tournament
The UEFA Technical Team was charged with naming a squad composed of the 23 best players over the course of the tournament. Spain, with eleven, had the most players in the team of the tournament.

UEFA Team of the Tournament

Goalscorers
4 goals

 Álvaro Morata

3 goals
 Thiago (1 assist — silver boot winner)
 Isco (0 assists — bronze boot winner)

2 goals

 Sebastian Rudy
 Manolo Gabbiadini
 Fabio Borini
 Georginio Wijnaldum
 Leroy Fer

1 goal

 Craig Dawson
 Lewis Holtby
 Patrick Herrmann
 Alon Turgeman
 Nir Biton
 Ofir Kriaf
 Alessandro Florenzi
 Andrea Bertolacci
 Ciro Immobile
 Lorenzo Insigne
 Riccardo Saponara
 Adam Maher
 Danny Hoesen
 Luuk de Jong
 Ola John
 Fredrik Semb Berge
 Harmeet Singh
 Jo Inge Berget
 Magnus Wolff Eikrem
 Marcus Pedersen
 Stefan Strandberg
 Alan Dzagoev
 Denis Cheryshev
 Álvaro Vázquez
 Rodrigo

Official match ball
The official ball for the UEFA European Under-21 Championship was unveiled during the draw in Tel Aviv on 28 November 2012. The ball had the same blue and white colours as tournament hosts Israel and its design featured the same thermally bonded triangular patterns as the Adidas Tango 12, match ball of UEFA Euro 2012.

Calls to boycott tournament
After Israel was announced as host, there were calls by some to boycott the tournament. 
The most prominent petition against the tournament taking place in Israel was organised by the Palestine Solidarity Campaign, which demanded UEFA President Michel Platini reverse his decision. Another petition organised by Muslim Public Affairs Committee UK demanded that UEFA move the tournament to England after the UEFA considered asking the FA to be on standby if the Gaza-Israel conflict continued.

Another petition, organised by former Sevilla footballer Frédéric Kanouté and containing the name of 50 professional footballers who had signed it, also gained media attention but attracted criticism when some of the names listed on it were disputed. Didier Drogba, for example, claimed he never signed the petition and his name was removed from the list.

Broadcast from UEFA European Under-21 Championship

Américas 

 : ESPN, ESPN 2 or ESPN 3 (All matches live in Pay TV)
 : SporTV
 Spanish speaking Latin America: DirecTV Sports (South América and Caribbean) / SKY (Mexico and Central América) (All matches live on Channels of DirecTV Sports in South América and Caribbean / Sky Sports in Mexico and Central América). 
Free TV

 : Monte Carlo TV
 : SNT (Channel 9) and Paravisión (Channel 5)
 : RTS (Canal 6) and LaTele (Channel 14).
 : Telecanal
  ATV (Channel 9) and Global TV (Channel 13)
 : RCTV and TVes

See also 
 2013 UEFA European Under-21 Championship squads
 2013 UEFA European Under-21 Championship Final
 2013 UEFA European Under-21 Championship qualification

References

External links

Official website
The official website of the tournament in Hebrew

 
2013
2012–13 in European football
2012–13 in Israeli football
2013 UEFA European Under-21 Championship
June 2013 sports events in Europe
2013 in youth association football
International sports competitions hosted by Israel
Football, 2013 European Championship U21
2013 in Israeli sport
2010s in Tel Aviv
June 2013 sports events in Asia